Apollonias is a genus of flowering plants belonging to the laurel family, Lauraceae. The genus includes from one to 10 species of evergreen trees and shrubs, depending on circumscription; recent studies have limited the genus to just one species, with the others transferred to Beilschmiedia.

Species
Generally accepted species
 Apollonias barbujana (syn. A. canariensis) Canary laurel, barbusano, - Azores, Canary Islands, Madeira

Other species sometimes included
 A. arnottii - Western Ghats
 A. grandiflora (syn. Beilschmiedia velutina)
 A. madagascariensis (syn. B. madagascariensis)
 A. microphylla (syn. B. microphylla)
 A. oppositifolia (syn. B. opposita) voakoromanga - Madagascar
 A. sericea (syn. B. sericans)
 A. velutina (syn. B. velutina)
 A. zeylanica (syn. B. zeylanica)

References

Lauraceae genera
Monotypic Laurales genera
Lauraceae